Anzû, also known as dZû and Imdugud (Sumerian:  AN.IM.DUGUDMUŠEN), is a lesser divinity or monster in several Mesopotamian religions. He was conceived by the pure waters of the Apsu and the wide Earth, or as son of Siris. Anzû was depicted as a massive bird who can breathe fire and water, although Anzû is alternately depicted as a lion-headed eagle.

Stephanie Dalley, in Myths from Mesopotamia, writes that "the Epic of Anzu is principally known in two versions: an Old Babylonian version of the early second millennium [BC], giving the hero as Ningirsu; and 'The Standard Babylonian' version, dating to the first millennium BC, which appears to be the most quoted version, with the hero as Ninurta". However, the Anzu character does not appear as often in some other writings, as noted below.

Name

In texts of the Old Babylonian period, the name is more often found as  AN.IM.DUGUDMUŠEN. In 1961, Landsberger argued that this name should be read as "Anzu", and most researchers have followed suit. In 1989, Thorkild Jacobsen noted that the original reading of the cuneiform signs as written (giving the name "dIM.dugud") is also valid, and was probably the original pronunciation of the name, with Anzu derived from an early phonetic variant. Similar phonetic changes happened to parallel terms, such as imdugud (meaning "heavy wind") becoming ansuk. Changes like these occurred by evolution of the im to an (a common phonetic change) and the blending of the new n with the following d, which was aspirated as dh, a sound which was borrowed into Akkadian as z or s.

It has also been argued based on contextual evidence and transliterations on cuneiform learning tablets, that the earliest, Sumerian form of the name was at least sometimes also pronounced Zu, and that Anzu is primarily the Akkadian form of the name. However, there is evidence for both readings of the name in both languages, and the issue is confused further by the fact that the prefix  (AN) was often used to distinguish deities or even simply high places. AN.ZU could therefore mean simply "heavenly eagle".

Origin and cultural evolution

Thorkild Jacobsen proposed that Anzu was an early form of the god Abu, who was also syncretized by the ancients with Ninurta/Ningirsu, a god associated with thunderstorms. Abu was referred to as "Father Pasture", illustrating the connection between rainstorms and the fields growing in Spring. According to Jacobsen, this god was originally envisioned as a huge black thundercloud in the shape of an eagle, and was later depicted with a lion's head to connect it to the roar of thunder. Some depictions of Anzu therefore depict the god alongside goats (which, like thunderclouds, were associated with mountains in the ancient Near East) and leafy boughs. The connection between Anzu and Abu is further reinforced by a statue found in the Tell Asmar Hoard depicting a human figure with large eyes, with an Anzu bird carved on the base. It is likely that this depicts Anzu in his symbolic or earthly form as the Anzu-bird, and in his higher, human-like divine form as Abu. Though some scholars have proposed that the statue actually represents a human worshiper of Anzu, others have pointed out that it does not fit the usual depiction of Sumerian worshipers, but instead matches similar statues of gods in human form with their more abstract form or their symbols carved onto the base.

Sumerian and Akkadian myth

In Sumerian and Akkadian mythology, Anzû is a divine storm-bird and the personification of the southern wind and the thunder clouds. This demon—half man and half bird—stole the "Tablet of Destinies" from Enlil and hid them on a mountaintop. Anu ordered the other gods to retrieve the tablet, even though they all feared the demon. According to one text, Marduk killed the bird; in another, it died through the arrows of the god Ninurta.

Anzu also appears in the story of "Inanna and the Huluppu Tree", which is recorded in the preamble to the Sumerian epic poem Gilgamesh, Enkidu, and the Netherworld.

Anzu appears in the Sumerian Lugalbanda and the Anzud Bird (also called: The Return of Lugalbanda).

Babylonian and Assyrian myth

The shorter Old Babylonian version was found at Susa. Full version in Myths from Mesopotamia: Creation, The Flood, Gilgamesh, and Others by Stephanie Dalley, page 222 and at The Epic of Anzû, Old Babylonian version from Susa, Tablet II, lines 1-83, read by Claus Wilcke. 
The longer Late Assyrian version from Nineveh is most commonly called The Myth of Anzu. (Full version in Dalley, page 205). An edited version is at Myth of Anzu. Latest editions of the Old Babylonian, Standard Babylonian and Neo-Assyrian (Late Assyrian) versions of the myth are published in the electronic Babylonian Library.

See also
Anzu wyliei, a theropod dinosaur named for Anzû
 Asakku, similar Mesopotamian deity
 Griffin or griffon, lion-bird hybrid
 Lamassu, Assyrian deity, bull/lion-eagle-human hybrid
 Tengu, Japanese magical creature half-man half-bird
 Hybrid creatures in mythology
 List of hybrid creatures in mythology
 Tiamat
 Ziz, giant griffin-like bird in Jewish mythology
 Zeus, Greek deity of sky and thunder
 Zuism, Icelander protest against tax for religion

References

External links

Anzû, electronic Babylonian Library
Zu on Encyclopædia Britannica

The Assyro-Babylonian Mythology FAQ: Anzû
 ETCSL glossary showing Zu as the verb 'to know'
 Myth of Anzu
Ninurta's return to Nibru: a šir-gida to Ninurta and The Return of Ninurta to Nippur
Ninurta and the Turtle and Ninurta and the Turtle, or Ninurta and Enki
Ninurta's exploits and The Exploits of Ninurta, or Lugal-e
Lugalbanda and the Anzud bird
The Epic of Anzû, Old Babylonian version from Susa, Tablet II, lines 1-83, read by Claus Wilcke

Mesopotamian gods
Sky and weather gods
Mythological birds of prey
Mesopotamian demons
Mythological monsters
Lion deities
Avian humanoids